Kovner is the surname of:
 Abba Kovner, Israeli poet and World War II partisan
 Ber Kovner, Israeli politician
 Bruce Kovner, American businessman
 Rachel Kovner (born 1979), American judge

See also 
 Kowner
 Kovner–Besicovitch measure, named after mathematician S. S. Kovner